French music may refer to:

Music of France, music of the French people in France

French music may also refer to the music of French-speaking countries:
Music of Quebec, music of the French-Canadians in Canada, most often Québécois or Acadians
Music of Belgium
Music of Switzerland
Music of Monaco
Music of Luxembourg

French styles of music may refer to:
French classical music
French opera
French folk music
French popular music
French pop music
French jazz
French electronic music
French house music
French rock
Chanson
Nouvelle Chanson
Bal-musette
Cabaret
Yéyé